Holger Bech Nielsen (born 25 August 1941) is a Danish theoretical physicist and professor emeritus at the Niels Bohr Institute, at the University of Copenhagen, where he started studying physics in 1961.

Work
Nielsen has made original contributions to theoretical particle physics, specifically in the field of string theory. Independently of Nambu and Susskind, he was the first to propose that the Veneziano model was actually a theory of strings, leading him to be considered among the fathers of string theory. He was awarded the Humboldt Prize in 2001 for his research. Several physics concepts are named after him, e.g. Nielsen–Olesen vortex and the Nielsen-Ninomiya no-go theorem for representing chiral fermions on the lattice. In the original Dual-Models, which later would be recognized as the origins of string theory, the Koba-Nielsen variables are also named after him and his collaborator Ziro Koba.

Nielsen is known in Denmark for his enthusiastic public lectures on physics and string theory, and he is often interviewed in daily news, especially on matters regarding particle physics.

In a series of papers uploaded to arXiv.org in 2009, Nielsen and fellow physicist Masao Ninomiya proposed a radical theory to explain the seemingly improbable series of failures preventing the Large Hadron Collider (LHC) from becoming operational. The collider was intended to be used to find evidence of the hypothetical Higgs boson particle. They suggested that the particle might be so abhorrent to nature that its creation would ripple backward through time and stop the collider before it could create one, in a fashion similar to the time travel Grandfather paradox. Subsequently the LHC claimed the discovery of Higgs boson on 4 July 2012.

Nielsen is a member of the Norwegian Academy of Science and Letters.

See also
Pregeometry (physics)

References

Further reading

Leake, J. (18 October 2009) A particle God doesn’t want us to discover The Sunday Times
Nielsen, H. B. & Ninomiya, M. (2009) Test of Effect from Future in Large Hadron Collider; A Proposal
Nielsen, H. B. & Ninomiya, M. (2009) Search for Future Influence from LHC
Nielsen, H. B. & Ninomiya, M. (2009) Card game restriction in LHC can only be successful!

External links
Holger Bech Nielsen, personal page.
Teorien om alting/The Theory of Everything, Internet Movie Database.
 Videnskaben eller Gud?/Science Or God?, webpage about the book in Danish.

1941 births
Living people
Danish physicists
String theorists
Particle physicists
University of Copenhagen alumni
Academic staff of the University of Copenhagen
Members of the Norwegian Academy of Science and Letters
Theoretical physicists